Alfred Hedemann was an Australian tennis player. He won the doubles title alongside Ernie Parker at the Australasian Championships, the future Australian Open, in 1913. In the 1921 Australasian championships, held at Perth, Hedemann beat Keith McDougall in the semi finals before losing to Rice Gemmell in the final. Hedemann worked for the Bank of Australasia. He moved to Tasmania to be manager of the Launceston branch in 1933 and retired in 1940. Hedemann had been a fine cricketer and lacrosse player.

Grand Slam finals

Singles (1)

Runner-up (1)

Doubles (1)

Winner (1)

References

Australasian Championships (tennis) champions
Australian male tennis players
Year of death missing
1880 births
Tennis people from New South Wales
Grand Slam (tennis) champions in men's doubles